The Pazmanitentempel, also known as the Synagoge in der Leopoldstadt, Pazmanitengasse 6, was a large synagogue in Vienna's second district Leopoldstadt. It was designed and constructed by the architect Ignaz Reiser and dedicated on 28 September 1913. The building was financed by Adolf Schramek (1845–1915)
 who signed the contract with the builder in 1910. Originally from Leipnik, Moravia, Schramek became one of Vienna's most successful coal merchants. The Pazmaniten synagogue was, therefore, not built by the Kultusgemeinde but by a temple club (Verein) Am Volkert, or Aeschel Awrachom (Tent of Abraham) of which Schramek was the president. Plans and photographs of the virtual reconstruction of the synagogue are illustrated in the book "The Destroyed Synagogues of Vienna" (2009) by Martens and Peter.

The synagogue, once described as the most beautiful in Vienna, was destroyed during the Nazi pogroms of the Reichskristallnacht after the Anschluss of Austria to Nazi Germany in 1938.

References

Literature 
 Bob Martens, Herbert Peter: "The Destroyed Synagogues of Vienna - Virtual city walks". Vienna: LIT Verlag, 2011.
 Genee, P: "Wiener Synagogen", 1987

Synagogues in Vienna
Synagogues destroyed during Kristallnacht (Austria)
Former synagogues in Austria
Buildings and structures in Leopoldstadt
Vienna Pazmanitentempel
1913 establishments in Austria
1938 disestablishments in Austria
20th-century architecture in Austria